The 1950 Swiss motorcycle Grand Prix was the fourth race of the 1950 Grand Prix motorcycle racing season. It took place on the weekend of 23 July 1950 in Geneva.

500 cc classification

350 cc classification

250 cc classification

Sidecar classification

References

Swiss motorcycle Grand Prix
Swiss motorcycle Grand Prix
Motorcycle Grand Prix